LA1TV (officially the Lancaster University Students' Union Television Station, often simply LA1) is a non-profit student television station at Lancaster University. It is a constitutional part of the Lancaster University Students' Union, but is run as an independent student society. Some of LA1's current programmes include Sugar TV and the FTO (full time officers of the students union) catchup. LA1TV is currently ran by Station Manager Eve Harding.

History
The Lancaster University Student Television Station was founded by PhD students Michelle Ryan and Alberto Ramirez, alongside a changeable team of first-year undergraduates. It was granted LUSU constitutional status under the name LUTube.tv in April 2008. LUTube was given two main, and sometimes conflicting, objectives: to inform and entertain the student population at Lancaster University, and to give members of student media the chance to produce their own television shows. The station would be run by a team of executives, headed by a Station Manager, who would be elected each year from the student media membership. Though much has changed about the station since then, these constitutional bye laws have not.

LUTube.tv encountered several problems in its first years. The idea of a student television station was resisted by Lancaster University's legal counsel, by the university television service and by student radio station 87.7 Bailrigg FM. LUTube also had to begin with limited resources, at one point resorting to the use of a camera phone. The extension “.tv” was not part of its initial branding, but had to be included because internet searches for “lutube” yielded an unfortunate number of pornographic sites. On top of this, exactly half of its pilot shows were never aired, often due to the crew's inexperience with video editing.

LUTube.tv was temporarily shut down in May 2011. One Station Manager commented with hindsight that the station had become notorious for unproductive and unimaginative activity, “producing lacklustre content irregularly”. The LUSU Vice President for Media and Communications at the time, however, said LUTube had not received enough credit for its work. Months later the station re-opened with a stronger brand culture and a new name, LA1:TV, which came from the campus postcode district. LA1 began by launching a number of what would become its longest-running shows, including campus news review The LA1 Show and nightlife programme Sugar TV. In its first quarter the new website received over 16,000 views. For its first six years, this website relied on a YouTube channel to display its videos, but LA1 has since developed software to host the entirety of its own content. The crew introduced its first regular live broadcast, the breakfast show Good Morning Lancaster, in 2014. Since then GML has aired every week during term time and has become an award-winning flagship programme.

LA1 now has a dedicated studio and office space on campus in Slaidburn House, and a stock of television hardware and branded materials. It regularly covers arts and sports events with the student societies at Lancaster University, including an annual outside broadcast of the largest intervarsity sports tournament in Europe. Some of its more irregular projects have included recording the thoughts of a Holocaust survivor, producing a documentary for the British Army, and interviewing Home Secretary Theresa May. LA1 also hosted Fresher TV for NaSTA in 2013 and the NaSTA Awards in 2015.

Awards

Executive committee 
Like all other student societies at Lancaster University, LA1 is organised and overseen by an internally elected group of Executive Committee members.

Roles 
 Station Manager
 Deputy Station Manager
 Treasurer
 Secretary
 Safety and Welfare Officer
 Production Manager
 Live Events Coordinator
 Technical Manager
 Marketing Manager
 Social Secretary

See also
Student television in the United Kingdom

References

External links
LA1TV

Student television stations in the United Kingdom
Culture of Lancaster University
Television channels and stations established in 2008